In Etruscan myth and religion, Mantus was a god of the underworld in the Po Valley as described by Servius. A dedication to the god manθ from the Archaic period was found in a sanctuary at Pontecagnano. His name is thought to be the origin of Mantua (Italian Mantova), the birthplace of Virgil.

Elsewhere in Etruria, the god was called Śuri, probably to be identified with Soranus, a Sabine deity associated with the underworld.

The consort of Mantus was Mania. The names of this divine couple indicate that they were connected to the Manes, chthonic divinities or spirits of the dead in ancient Roman belief and called man(im) by the Etruscans.

References

Etruscan gods
Underworld gods